Elfin of Warrington is a little-known saint venerated in medieval Warrington, near the modern city of Liverpool. He is known only from one entry in the Domesday Book, his cult or church holding one carucate of land. The name is Brittonic, derived from Latin Alpinus.

Notes

References

 
 

Mercian saints
Medieval Welsh saints